National children's parliament (season 7) is an organisation in Nigeria that adds the interest of children in policy making. It was inaugurated by the Federal Government, President Muhammadu Buhari.

History
The Nigerian National children's parliament  season six was sponsored by the Federal Minister of Women affairs, Dame Tallen in association with Save the children non profitable international organisation, Usa. It was hosted and presented by Charles chinedu Ndukauba at sandralia Hotel, Abuja on the 11th to 13th of December, 2022.

Mission Statement 
To create a platform that with the support of key stakeholders, will allow children to express their concerns about their development, survival and participation in decision-making.

List of Housemates

May not reflect on all names

Reference

Child welfare in Nigeria
Child welfare